Fānziquán (literally "Rotating fist") is a Chinese martial art that emphasizes offense and defense with the hands.  Its movements have been described as:

 Two fists are fast like the falling rain drops, and fast like a snapping whip.

Fānziquán routines are usually quite short and very fast.

History
Until at least the Ming Dynasty (1368–1644), Fānziquán was known as Bāshǎnfān (literally "8 flash tumbles"), or "8 evasive tumbles" and is attributed to General Qi Jiguang. Whereas in the Qing Dynasty it art is known as BāfānMén.

According to the Bafanquan manuals, during the Ming dynasty a master named Wang Zhiyuan had been taught the boxing by a mountain wanderer in the turn of the 17th century. It is said that Master Wang was an accomplished warrior but had become injured in battle in a remote part of what is currently Shandong province. There, the wanderer assisted with Master Wang's injuries and instructed him in the methods of Bafanquan to improve his already good martial skills.

The style then passed down through various generations in the Northern provinces such as Henan, Hebei and Shandong. During the Qing dynasty, one of the most famous exponents of the style was Master Li Gongran from Xiong county in Hebei province. During that time he became a famed boxer, and it was claimed that "from Nanjing to Beijing, all Fanzi under heaven belongs to Li Gong (Grandmaster Li)". This indicated how key he was to the spread and development of the style. His son Li Erlou, and disciple Feng Zhenyuan, taught the style in Sunning county.  Their students founded many "Security Logistics Bureaus".

In modern times, Fānziquán is often taught in conjunction with Chuōjiǎo, not unlike how Xíngyìquán and Bāguàzhǎng are often taught together. The routines of Chuōjiǎo, with its kicks, wide open stances and focus on hard power, were known as Martial Routines and those of Fānziquán, with their more compact movements combining soft and hard power, were known as Scholarly Routines, which is why the Chuōjiǎo/Fānziquán combination is known as Wen Wu or Martial-Scholar.

Both Fānziquán and Chuōjiǎo are associated with the 12th century Song Dynasty general Yue Fei, and the association between the two may date that far back. However, as a legendary figure, Yue Fei has had many martial arts attributed to him. Nonetheless, the association between the two is very old.

By the mid-19th century, Zhao Canyi, a general in the failed Taiping Rebellion, was a master of both styles.  After the failure of the rebellion, Zhao went into seclusion in Raoyang, Hebei Province, where he taught Fānziquán, which emphasizes the hands, to the Wang family and Chuōjiǎo, which emphasizes the feet, to the Duan family. During practice, the families would exchange techniques.

The complete system of Fānziquán of Hebei province is rarely practiced today. The Dongbei Style of Fānziquán is the most popular and was also the basis on which the Modern Wushu Fānziquán routines have been based. Elements or parts of Old BāfānMén have been spread under many banners.  

 Liu DeKuan taught a set of Ba Fan Shou in Beijing which has been practiced by his descendants. 

 The Eagle Claw style, which is a derivative of Fānziquán, includes a set of Xingquan and Lianquan which are said to be the essence of the style and are based on some parts of BāfānMén. 

 In turn the Yingzhao Fanziquan style is a combination of Fanzi, Eagle Claw and Leopard Kung Fu. 

 The Ma Family Tongbei System of North Western China includes the Dongbei variants of Fānziquán. 

 The Mianzhang style (Duanquan) was combined with Hebei Fanzi to create the style Mianzhang Fanzi.

Throughout history, BāfānMén's techniques have been admired by many masters and as a result it is often recognized as Muquan, or Mother Fist, in representing how essential it is to the Chinese Martial Arts.

References

External links
Ba Fan Men

Chinese martial arts